"Artsakh" is an instrumental folk song from Armenian contemporary composer Ara Gevorgyan's 1999 album Ani. The song has become wildly popular in Armenia. Over the years, it has been used in cultural and political events and occasions. Figure skaters, gymnasts, and other athletes around the world have also used the song.

Name
Artsakh was one of the 15 provinces of the ancient Kingdom of Armenia. Today, Artsakh is still the Armenian name of the disputed region of Nagorno-Karabakh. The region achieved de facto independence alongside Armenian forces during the  during the bloody war with Azerbaijan in 1988-94. The war is seen by Armenians as liberation of their historic lands and the song is a tribute to the Armenian victory.

Usage in sports

Parts of "Artsakh" have been used in sports, including:

Other
 Pan-Armenian Games
 In a Russian TV show called "Ice Age" broadcast by the Channel One in 2007 Russian singer Aleksandra Savaleva and a Russian-born Israeli ice dancer Sergei Sakhnovski performed figure skating with this song.

Controversy
In 2007 Azerbaijani ambassador in Russia and former singer Polad Bülbüloğlu alleged that "Artsakh" contains an Azerbaijani song. Ara Georgyan responded that Bülbüloğlu's statements were a result of confusion from an incident that occurred during one of the episodes of the Russian TV show "Ice Age" broadcast by Channel One. During the performance of Russian singer Aleksandra Savaleva (ru) and Israeli ice dancer Sergei Sakhnovski, it was initially announced that the song they were going to use was called "Armenian dance" by Ara Gevorgyan, but instead a song called "Sene de galmaz" by Azerbaijani composer Tofig Guliyev was played and only after that a small portion of "Artsakh" was played. Ara Gevorgyan suggested that Azerbaijanis tried to justify Dinara Gimatova's use of the song without his permission in a 2005 grand-prix.

References

1999 songs
Armenian songs